The Dashavatara are the ten primary avatars of Vishnu, a principal Hindu god. Vishnu is said to descend in the form of an avatar to restore cosmic order.

The list of included avatars varies across sects and regions, particularly in respect to the inclusion of Balarama (brother of Krishna) or Gautama Buddha. Though no list can be uncontroversially presented as standard, the "most accepted list found in Puranas and other texts is [...] Krishna, Buddha." Most draw from the following set of figures, in this order: Matsya; Kurma; Varaha; Narasimha; Vamana; Parashurama; Rama; Krishna or Balarama; Buddha or Krishna; and Kalki. In traditions that omit Krishna, he often replaces Vishnu as the source of all avatars. Some traditions include a regional deity such as Vithoba or Jagannath in penultimate position, replacing Krishna or Buddha. All avatars have appeared except one; Kalki, who will appear at the end of the Kali Yuga.

The order of the ancient concept of Dashavataras has also been interpreted to be reflective of modern Darwinian evolution, as a description of the evolution of consciousness. Some Hindu texts say there are 24 Avatars of Vishnu.

Etymology 
"Dashavatara" or "" (दशावतार) means "ten avatars" or "ten incarnations":

 "Dash" or "Daśā" (दश) means "ten"
 "Avatara" (अवतार) means "incarnation"

List of Avatars
According to Swami Parmeshwaranand, although the avatars of Vishnu are countless in number and include hermits, Manus, sons of Manus, and other Devas (gods), due to the curse of a Rishi called Bhrgu most are only partial (i.e. incomplete) incarnations. The Dashavatara is a list of the ten complete (i.e. full) incarnations.

Lists 
Various versions of the list of Vishnu's avatars exist, varying per region and tradition. Some lists mention Krishna as the eighth avatar and the Buddha as the ninth avatar, while others – such as the Yatindramatadipika, a 17th-century summary of Srivaisnava doctrine – give Balarama as the eighth avatar and Krishna as the ninth. The latter version is followed by some Vaishnavas who do not accept the Buddha as an incarnation of Vishnu. Though no list can be uncontroversially presented as standard, the "most accepted list found in Puranas and other texts is [...] Krishna, Buddha."

The following table summarises the position of avatars within the Dashavatara in many but not all traditions:

In the Puranas 

The Agni, Padma, Garuda, Linga, Narada, Skanda and Varaha Puranas mention the common (Krishna, Buddha) Dashavatara list. The Garuda Purana has two lists, one longer list with Krishna and Buddha, and a list with Balarama and Buddha, which substitutes Vamana for Rama. The Shiva Purana has Balarama and Krishna. The list with Krishna and Buddha is also found in the Garuda Purana Saroddhara, a commentary or ‘extracted essence’ of the Garuda Purana (i.e. not the Purana itself, with which it seems to be confused):

Description of the avatars

 Matsya: The fish avatar. King Vaivasvata Manu finds a little fish in the palm of his hands when performing the tarpana (water-offering). The fish asks Manu if his riches and power was enough to give the fish a nice home. Manu keeps the fish to give it a home, but the fish keeps expanding, which breaks Manu's pride about his wealth. Eventually, he releases it into the ocean, realizing it is Vishnu himself. Vishnu informs Manu of the coming destruction of the world, by means of fires and floods, and directs Manu to collect "all creatures of the world" and keep them safe on a boat built by the gods. When the deluge (Pralaya) occurs, Vishnu appears as a great fish with a horn, to which Manu ties the boat, which leads them into safety.
 Kurma: The tortoise/turtle avatar. In the legend of the Samudra Manthana, the devas and asuras were churning the Ocean of Milk in order to obtain amrita, the nectar of immortality. They used the mountain Mandara as the churning shaft, which started to sink. Vishnu took the form of a tortoise to bear the weight of the mountain to allow them to complete their task.
 Varaha: The boar avatar. The gatekeepers of Vaikuntha, the abode of Vishnu, Jaya and Vijaya, are cursed by the Four Kumaras when they stop them from seeing Vishnu. They choose to be reborn three times as asuras as adversaries of Vishnu. In their first birth, they are born as the brothers Hiranyaksha and Hiranyakashipu. Varaha appeared to defeat Hiranyaksha, who had abducted the earth, and by extension the earth goddess, Bhumi, and carried it to the bottom of the cosmic ocean. The battle between Varaha and Hiranyaksha is believed to have lasted for a thousand years, which the former finally won. Varaha carried the earth out of the ocean between his tusks and restored it to its place in the universe.
 Narasimha: The half-man/half-lion avatar. Hiranyakashipu persecuted everyone for their religious beliefs including his son, Prahlada, who was a devotee of Vishnu. The boy was protected by the god and could not be killed, thus being saved by the several attempts of getting harmed. Vishnu descended as an anthropomorphic incarnation, with the body of a man and head and claws of a lion. He disemboweled Hiranyakashipu, and brought an end to the persecution of human beings, including his devotee Prahlada.
 Vamana: The dwarf avatar. The grandson of Prahlada, Bali, with devotion and penance was able to defeat Indra, the king of heaven. This humbled the other deities and extended his authority over the three worlds. The gods appealed to Vishnu for protection and he descended as a boy Vamana. During a yajna of the king, Vamana approached him and Bali promised him for whatever he asked. Vamana asked for three paces of land. Bali agreed, and the dwarf then changed his size to that of the giant Trivikrama form. With his first stride he covered the earthly realm, with the second he covered the heavenly realm thereby symbolically covering the abode of all living beings. He then took the third stride for the netherworld. Bali realized that Vamana was Vishnu incarnate. In deference, the king offered his head as the third place for Vamana to place his foot. The avatar did so and thus granted Bali immortality and making him ruler of Pathala, the netherworld. Vishnu also   granted Bali a boon whereby he could return to earth every year. The harvest festivals of Balipratipada and Onam (which is mostly celebrated by people of all faiths within Kerala) are celebrated to mark his yearly homecoming. This legend appears in hymn 1.154 of the Rigveda and other Vedic as well as Puranic texts.
 Parashurama: The warrior avatar. He is the son of Jamadagni and Renuka and was granted as a boon, an axe after a penance to Shiva. Once, the king Kartavirya Arjuna and his hunting party halted at the ashrama of Jamadagni, the father of Parashurama. The sage was able to feed them all with the aid of the divine cow Kamadhenu. The king demanded the cow, but Jamadagni refused. Enraged, the king took it by force and destroyed the ashrama and left along with the cow. Parashurama then killed the king at his palace and destroyed his army. In revenge, the sons of Kartavirya killed Jamadagni. Parashurama took a vow to  travel across the world twenty-one times and kill every kshatriya king on earth filled five lakes with their blood. Ultimately, his grandfather, the rishi Ricika, appeared before him and made him halt. He is a chiranjivi (immortal), and believed to be alive today in penance at Mahendragiri. He is also credited with creating the coastal belt of Karnataka and Kerala by throwing his mighty axe as per Hindu mythology. The place the axe landed in the sea got its water displaced and the land which emerged thus came to be known as the coast of Karnataka and whole of Kerala. 
 Rama: The King of Ayodhya. He is a commonly worshipped avatar in Hinduism, and is thought of as the ideal man, and the embodiment of righteousness. His story is recounted in one of the most widely read scriptures of Hinduism, the Ramayana. While in exile from his own kingdom with his brother Lakshmana and wife Sita, she was abducted by the rakshasa king of Lanka, Ravana. Rama travelled to Lanka, killed the rakshasa king and saved Sita. Rama and Sita returned home and were crowned. The day of the return of Prince Rama to the kingdom of Ayodhya is celebrated in the festival of Diwali all over India.
 Krishna (sometimes at 9 or "0") or Balarama:
 Krishna was the eighth son of Devaki and Vasudeva and the foster-son of Yashoda and Nanda. A frequently worshipped deity in Hinduism, he is born to slay his tyrannical uncle, Kamsa. He is a major protagonist of the Mahabharata, most notably featured in his role as the charioteer of Arjuna in the Kurukshetra War. He embodies several qualities such as love, duty, compassion, and playfulness. Krishna's birthday is celebrated every year by Hindus on Krishna Janmashtami according to the lunisolar Hindu calendar, which falls in late August or early September of the Gregorian calendar. Krishna is usually depicted with a flute in his hand. Krishna is also a central character in Mahabharata, Bhagavata Purana, and the Bhagavad Gita.
 Balarama, the elder brother of Krishna, is regarded generally as an avatar of Shesha an extension of Ananta, a form of Vishnu. Balarama is included as the eighth avatar of Vishnu in the Sri Vaishnava lists, where Buddha is omitted and Krishna appears as the ninth avatar in this list. He is particularly included in the lists where Krishna is removed.
 Buddha; sometimes Krishna, (sometimes at 8 or "0"), Vithoba, or Jagannath.
 Gautama Buddha, the founder of Buddhism, is commonly included as an avatar of Vishnu in Hinduism. Buddha is sometimes depicted in Hindu scriptures as a preacher who deludes and leads asuras and heretics away from the path of the Vedic scriptures, but another view praises him a compassionate teacher who preached the path of ahimsa (non-violence).
 Krishna; commonly at 8, sometimes at "0"
 In Maharashtra and Goa, Vithoba's image replaces Buddha as the ninth avatar of Vishnu in some temple sculptures and Hindu astrological almanacs. 
 In certain Odia literary creations from Odisha, Jagannath has been treated as the Ninth avatar, by substituting Buddha.
 Kalki is described as the final incarnation of Vishnu, who appears at the end of each Kali Yuga. He will be atop a white horse and his sword will be drawn, blazing like a comet. He appears when only chaos, evil and persecution prevails, dharma has vanished, and he ends the Kali Yuga to restart Satya Yuga and another cycle of existence.

Historical development

Buddha

The Buddha was included as one of the avatars of Vishnu under Bhagavatism by the Gupta period between 330 and 550 CE. The mythologies of the Buddha in the Theravada tradition and of Vishnu in Hinduism share a number of structural and substantial similarities. For example, states Indologist John Holt, the Theravada cosmogony and cosmology states the Buddha covered 6,800,000 yojanas in three strides, including earth to heaven and then placed his right foot over Yugandhara – a legend that parallels that of the Vamana avatar in Hinduism. Similarly, the Buddha is claimed in the Theravada mythology to have been born when dharma is in decline, so as to preserve and uphold the dharma. These similarities may have contributed to the assimilation of the Buddha as an avatar of Vishnu.

The adoption of Buddha as an avatar in Bhagavatism was a catalyzing factor in Buddhism's assimilation into Vaishnavism's mythic hierarchy. By the 8th century CE, the Buddha was included as an avatar of Vishnu in several Puranas. This assimilation is indicative of the Hindu ambivalence toward the Buddha and Buddhism, and there is also a tradition that there were two Buddhas. According to this tradition, the first was the ninth avatar of Vishnu, while the second was the historical Buddha. Conversely, Vishnu has also been assimilated into Sinhalese Buddhist culture, and Mahayana Buddhism is sometimes called Buddha-Bhagavatism. By this period, the concept of Dashavatara was fully developed.

Krishna
Jayadeva, in his Pralaya Payodhi Jale from  the Gita Govinda, includes Balarama and Buddha where Krishna is equated with Vishnu and the source of all avatars.

In traditions that emphasize the Bhagavata Purana, Krishna is the original Supreme Personality of Godhead, from whom everything else emanates. Gaudiya Vaishnavas worship Krishna as Svayam Bhagavan, or source of the incarnations. The Vallabha Sampradaya and Nimbarka Sampradaya, (philosophical schools) go even further, worshiping Krishna not only as the source of other incarnations, but also Vishnu himself, related to descriptions in the Bhagavata Purana. Mahanubhavas also known as the Jai Kishani Panth, considers Krishna as the supreme God and don't consider the list of Dashavatara while consider another list of Panchavatara (5 Avatars).

Thirty-nine avatars are mentioned in the Pañcaratra including the likes of Garuda. However, despite these lists, the commonly accepted number of ten avatars for Vishnu was fixed well before the 10th century CE.

Jyotisha interpretation 
The term "Jyotisha" refers to Hindu or Vedic astrology, one of the six Vedangas or ancillary disciplines linked with the Vedas. The Brihat Parasara Hora Sastra mentions the Dashavatara as follows:

Notably, according to the Brihat Parasara Hora Sastra - an important Smriti Sastra or compilation of Indian astrology for prediction (i.e. fortune telling) - although all ten of the Dashavatara have corresponding astrological symbols, only four are considered as divine beings (i.e. Rama, Krishna, Narasimha and Varaha).

Evolutionary interpretation

Some modern interpreters interpret Vishnu's ten main avatars as an ascending order from simple life-forms to more complex life-forms, and see the Dashavataras as a reflection, or a foreshadowing, of the modern theory of evolution. Such an interpretation was first propounded by the Gaudiya Vaishnava saint Bhaktivinoda Thakura in his 1873 book Datta-kaustubha and again in his 1880 book Kṛṣṇa-saṁhita. Theosophist Helena Blavatsky also reiterated this in her 1877 opus Isis Unveiled. Bhaktivinoda Thakura proposed the following ordering of the Dashavataras:
 Matsya - fish (Paleozoic era)
 Kurma - amphibious tortoise (Mesozoic era)
 Varaha -  boar (Cenozoic era)
 Narasimha - man-lion, the last animal and semi-human avatar (Cenozoic era)
 Vamana - growing dwarf and first step towards the human form
 Parasurama - an early man who started using primitive weapons like Axe 
 Rama - an ideal hero, physically perfect, befriends a speaking vanara deity Hanuman
 Krishna - Vishnu incarnating as a God
 Buddha - the founder of Buddhism, an enlightened man
 Kalki - the next step in evolution; yet to happen and the savior, and is like Christian Advent, which Madame Blavatsky believed Christians "undoubtedly copied from the Hindus"
Blavatsky believed that the avatara-related Hindu texts were an allegorical presentation of Darwinian evolution. Some Orientalists and reformist Hindus in India picked up this idea to rationalize Hinduism as being consistent with modern science. Keshub Chandra Sen stated in 1882,

Similarly Aurobindo regarded "Avataric Evolutionism" as a "parable of evolution", one which does not endorse evolutionism, but hints at "transformative phases of spiritual progress". According to Nanda, the Dashavatara concept has led to some Hindus asserting that their religion is more open to scientific theories, and has not opposed or persecuted scientists midst them like the way Christianity and Islam has. But, adds Nanda, Hinduism has many cosmological theories and even the Vaishnava one with Dashavatara concept does not explicitly teach evolution of species, rather it states an endless cycles of creationism.

The Dashavatara concept appealed to other scholars. Monier Monier-Williams wrote "Indeed, the Hindus were ... Darwinians centuries before the birth of Darwin, and evolutionists centuries before the doctrine of evolution had been accepted by the Huxleys of our time, and before any word like evolution existed in any language of the world." J. B. S. Haldane(British-Indian scientist) suggested that Dashavatara gave a "rough idea" of vertebrate evolution: a fish, a tortoise, a boar, a man-lion, a dwarf and then four men (Kalki is not yet born). Nabinchandra Sen explains the Dashavatara with Darwin's evolution in his Raivatak. C. D. Deshmukh also remarked on the "striking" similarity between Darwin's theory and the Dashavatara.

Some Vaishnava Hindus reject this "Avataric Evolutionism" concept. For example, Prakashanand states that this apologeticism degrades the divine status of Rama and Krishna, unduly sequences Rama as inferior to Krishna, both to the Buddha. Rama and Krishna are supremely divine, each right and perfect for the circumstances they appeared in, states Prakashanand.

Notes

Subnotes

References

Sources

External links

 Avatars (Incarnations or Descents) of Vishnu

Hindu philosophical concepts
Vaishnavism